The 2019 European Games was a multi-sport event held in Minsk, Belarus from 21 to 30 June 2019.

Athletes from 43 NOCs won medals, leaving 7 NOCs without a medal, and 34 of them won at least one gold medal. Russia led the medal table of the 2nd European Games. They led all the medal categories, winning the most gold medals (44, nearly 25 % of total gold medals), the most silver medals (24), the most bronze medals (41) and the most medals overall (109). Bosnia and Herzegovina and Luxembourg won their first medals on European Games.

Medal table 
The medal table is based on information provided by the International Olympic Committee (IOC) and is consistent with IOC convention in its published medal tables. By default, the table is ordered by the number of gold medals the athletes from a nation have won, where nation is an entity represented by a National Olympic Committee (NOC). The number of silver medals is taken into consideration next and then the number of bronze medals. If nations are still tied, equal ranking is given and they are listed alphabetically.

Seven nations which failed to win any medals: Albania, Andorra, Iceland, Liechtenstein, Malta, Monaco and North Macedonia.

See also 
 All-time European Games medal table
 List of 2019 European Games medal winners

References 
 

 

Medal table
European Games medal tables